Le Rouet d'Omphale (The Spinning Wheel of Omphale or Omphale's Spinning Wheel), Op. 31, is a symphonic poem for orchestra, composed by Camille Saint-Saëns in 1871.  It is one of the most famous of the four symphonic poems in a mythological series by Saint-Saëns. The other three in the series are Danse macabre, Phaëton, and La jeunesse d'Hercule.

The middle section of Le Rouet d'Omphale was used as the theme music to the radio drama, The Shadow.

Analysis 
Apollo condemns Hercules to serve Omphale while disguised as a woman; for 3 years he  slaves (while wearing woman's dress) spinning wool for her on a spinning wheel.

References

External links

 
 

Compositions by Camille Saint-Saëns
Symphonic poems
Music based on European myths and legends
Compositions for symphony orchestra
1871 compositions
The Shadow
Heracles